Belmopan is the capital city of Belize. Its population in 2010 was 16,451. In addition to being the smallest capital city in the continental Americas by population, Belmopan is the third-largest settlement in Belize, behind Belize City and San Ignacio. Founded as a planned community in 1970, Belmopan is one of the newest national capital cities in the world. Since 2000, Belmopan has been one of two settlements in Belize to hold official city status, along with Belize City.

The government was moved to Belmopan in 1970. Its National Assembly Building is designed to resemble a Pre-Columbian Maya temple.

History
After Hurricane Hattie in 1961 destroyed approximately 75% of the houses and business places in low-lying and coastal Belize City, the government proposed to encourage and promote the building of a new capital city. This new capital would be on better terrain, would entail no costly reclamation of land, and would provide for an industrial area.

Since Belize was a British colony (known as British Honduras) in 1964, Premier George Cadle Price led a delegation to London to seek funds to finance the new capital. Although they were not ready to commit to funding such a large project, the British government showed interest due to the logic of locating the capital on high ground safe from storm surges. To encourage financial commitment from the British government, Premier Price and the People's United Party government invited Anthony Greenwood, Secretary of State for the Commonwealth and Colonies, to visit Belize. One of the highlights of this visit was the unveiling of a monument at mile 49 on the Western Highway. The monument records that Lord Greenwood dedicated the site for the new capital on 9 October 1965. In a way, there was a commitment.

The name chosen for the new capital, Belmopan, is derived from the union of two words: "Belize", the name of the longest river in the country, and "Mopan", one of the rivers in this area, which empties into the Belize River. The initial estimated cost for building this new city was 40 million Belize dollars (US$20.5 million). Only 20 million Belize dollars (US$10 million) were available, but the momentum was not to be lost.

In 1967, work began; the first phase of the new city was completed in 1970 at a cost of 24 million Belize dollars (US$12 million). From 1970 to 2000 the administration of Belmopan was managed by the Reconstruction and Development Corporation, known as "Recondev." Recondev was vested with the power and authority to provide, or cause to be provided, the municipal functions necessary for the smooth running of the city's business and infrastructure.

There was a reluctance initially amongst foreign governments to relocate their embassies to Belmopan as there was some doubt as to whether this inland area would really become the functioning capital. The British High Commission opened in 1981 when Belize achieved independence, moving to its current location in 1984. In February 2005, the United States government broke ground and started building a new embassy in Belmopan, 43 years after it was chosen as the new capital city. The U.S. embassy was officially opened on 11 December 2006. Mexico, Brazil, Costa Rica, El Salvador, and Venezuela also have embassies in Belmopan, while Ecuador, Chile, and the Dominican Republic are represented by consulates. However, with four embassies and 29 consulates the former capital of Belize City still has most of the country's foreign diplomatic community.

Design
The city layout centers around the Ring Road which is just under 4 km in circumference. The majority of government buildings are situated either within or around the Ring Road, and a large area within the Ring Road is also given to parkland.

The National Assembly Building is the focal point of the city's design, with the grey stone architecture and broad steps designed to resemble a Mayan temple, reflecting the nation's cultural heritage. Surrounding buildings mirror this design, with the East Wing and West Wing buildings contributing to the overall impression of an ancient Mayan plaza.

The original buildings were designed with extensive ventilation to accommodate the tropical climate leading to a pock-marked effect on the buildings' walls.

Extensive internal renovations and the widespread introduction of air-conditioners has caused this design to become ineffective and inefficient.

Geographic setting
(The climate at night is cool.) The city is off the Hummingbird Highway. Two and a half hours south of Belmopan, by road, is the Cockscomb Basin Wildlife Sanctuary.

Climate
Belmopan features a tropical monsoon climate (Am) under the Köppen climate classification. The city has a lengthy wet season that runs from May through January and a short dry season covering the remaining three months. As is the characteristic of many cities with a tropical monsoon climate, Belmopan sees some rainfall during its dry season. As with Belize City, these are somewhat unusual months for a city with a tropical monsoon climate to have its driest months of the year. Typically the driest month for a city with this climate type is the month after the winter solstice, which in Belmopan would be January.

Educational institutions
The city of Belmopan has three pre-schools, four primary schools and four secondary schools as well as a modern Regional Language Centre (RLC) on the central campus of the University of Belize, where students from neighbouring Spanish-speaking countries come to study English. University of Belize's campus in Belmopan has the following faculties: Education and Arts, Management and Social Sciences, Science and Technology, and Nursing and Allied Health. The church/state system prevails in Belizean education, especially where pre-school, primary and secondary school education is concerned, and nearly all schools in Belmopan are sustained by churches.

International schools:
 Belize Christian Academy
 QSI International School of Belize

Secondary schools:
 Belmopan Baptist High School

Local missionaries and non-profit organizations also provide practical educational opportunities for Belizeans.

Culture

Ethnic composition

The population of Belmopan proper (an estimated 20,000 people in 2009) is of various ethnicities, including Kriols, Garifuna, Mestizo, Maya, and recent immigrants from such Asian countries as the People's Republic of China (Mainland China) and Republic of China (Taiwan).

There are five zones around Belmopan proper:

Salvapan, with a population of 3,000, mostly of Central American origin;
San Martin, with 1,694 people of mixed origins (Kriol and Central American Mayan);
Las Flores, with 453 people of mostly Central American origin;
Maya Mopan, with 241 people, mostly Ketchi/Mopan Maya; and
Riviera, with an indeterminate population of Central American immigrants and local people.

Local and regional events
Some of Belmopan's noteworthy events include presentations by the Belmopan Choral Society, the Festival of Arts for school children, and National Day activities.

The University of Belize's Black Jaguars squad has won two national championships playing out of Belmopan. Nearby communities including Roaring Creek, Camalote, Esperanza, and Georgeville play a softball tournament in the early part of the year.

Social and community activities
The City Council promotes Belmopan as "The Garden City." A Crime prevention Initiative has recently been introduced by the council in conjunction with the Belize Police Department, which introduced a Special Constable/Community Policing Programme. The council cooperates with social organizations like the Lions Club, the Belize Scout Association, Rotary International, and other NGOs. Social and cultural events and meetings of community groups are frequently held at the George Price Centre.

Museums
Museums and galleries in the city include the planned Belmopan Museum.

Economy

Government

At its inception and afterward, Belmopan was governed by the corporation RECONDEV (Reconstruction and Development Corporation), which answered to the government.

Residents of Belmopan voted in a referendum in 1999 to switch to direct election of a city council. In 2000, Belmopan was incorporated as a city and held its first City Council election. Anthony Chanona of the People's United Party was elected mayor with a six-man slate, and reelected in 2003. Following the People's Party municipal victory of 2020, the mayor of Belmopan is Sharon Palacio.

As Belmopan is the seat of government, many of its inhabitants work for the national government in administrative or technical roles. Many are based in the large cluster of government buildings around the National Assembly building.

Commercial

Belmopan has approximately 589 business establishments (the 1997 census revealed the presence of 373). Five international banks are in the city, as are several local financial institutions. A bus terminal and market complex were constructed in 2003.

Industrial
While there is very little industrial activity at present, the council has embarked on a scheme to attract local and foreign investment to the city. Plans are underway to create a  industrial park close to the municipal airstrip – a paved 1,100-meter strip with no control tower or hangars.

Transportation

Rail 
Belmopan will have a light rail system that is currently undergoing a feasibility study conducted by the Japan International Cooperation Agency.

Air 
Belmopan is served by Hector Silva Airstrip, a domestic airport located in the Northwest of the city.

See also
Belmopan Public Library

References

External links

 Map of Belmopan 
 Online Portal of Belmopan
 Belmopan City Council Official Website

 
1970 establishments in North America
Belize River
Capitals in Central America
Capitals in North America
Planned capitals
Populated places established in 1970
Populated places in Cayo District
Belmopan (Belize House constituency)